Paul Friedlander or Paul Friedländer may refer to:

 Paul Friedländer (chemist) (1857–1923), German chemist
 Paul Friedländer (philologist) (1882–1968), German philologist
 (1891–1942), Austrian journalist and communist, and husband of Ruth Fischer
 Paul Friedlander (artist) (born 1951), English artist
 Paul Friedlander (golfer) (born c. 1970), Swazi golfer